Princess Raiyah bint Hussein (born 9 February 1986) is the younger daughter of King Hussein of Jordan and Queen Noor. She has two brothers, Hamzah and Hashem, as well as an elder sister, Princess Iman. She is a half-sister to King Abdullah II of Jordan.

Education 
Princess Raiyah attended the United World College of the Atlantic in Wales and received her undergraduate degree in Japanese at the University of Edinburgh. She took a year abroad studying at Ritsumeikan University in Japan. She received a postgraduate degree in Japanese literature from Columbia University.

She later moved to Tokyo, where she spent three years working in the field of human development. 

Currently, Princess Raiyah is a graduate student studying a PhD in the Department of Asian Languages and Cultures on "the reception of medieval warrior narratives in Japan and the Arab World and their impact upon the construction of national identities" at the University of California, Los Angeles (UCLA).

Official duties 
Princess Raiyah took part in official visits to Japan in 2007 and 2008, and accompanied King Abdullah II to the country in April 2009.  In 2008, she formed part of a Jordanian delegation on an official visit with King Abdullah II to South Korea.

Personal life
On 5 November 2019, the court announced Princess Raiyah's engagement to British-born journalist Ned Donovan, son of writer Tessa Dahl and Patrick Donovan, maternal grandson of Roald Dahl and Patricia Neal, and paternal grandson of Francis Patrick Donovan and Maria Kozslik. His half-sister is the model Sophie Dahl, who is married to the singer Jamie Cullum.

The pair married on 7 July 2020 in the United Kingdom with the permission of King Abdullah II, after their planned wedding in Jordan was cancelled due to the COVID-19 pandemic.

Princess Raiyah is reportedly very close with Talulah Riley, who referred to Raiyah as “my brain twin and most beloved voice in the universe” in the acknowledgment section of one of her novels.

Patronages
 Patron of The Performing Arts Center of Jordan.

Honours
 :
 Knight Grand Cordon of the Supreme Order of the Renaissance, Special Class
 Recipient of the Al-Hussein Medal of Excellence in Gold (First Class)

Ancestry

References 

1986 births
Living people
Jordanian princesses
Jordanian people of Scottish descent
Jordanian people of English descent
Jordanian people of Swedish descent
Jordanian people of American descent
Jordanian people of Syrian descent
People educated at Atlantic College
People educated at a United World College
Alumni of the University of Edinburgh
University of California, Los Angeles alumni
Ritsumeikan University alumni
Daughters of kings

Columbia Graduate School of Arts and Sciences alumni